Savage Times is the fourth studio album by American singer-songwriter Hanni El Khatib. It was released on February 17, 2017 through Innovative Leisure.

Track listing

Charts

References

2017 albums
Innovative Leisure albums